Baumea riparia is a flowering plant in the sedge family, Cyperaceae that is native to Western Australia.

It blooms between August and October producing brown flowers.

It found in swamps and on the margins of brackish lakes and creeks in the Peel, South West and Great Southern where it grows in black peaty-sand soils.

References

riparia
Plants described in 1874
Flora of Western Australia